David Acheson may refer to:

 David Acheson (mathematician) (born 1946), British applied mathematician
 David Campion Acheson (1921−2018), American attorney, lawyer and son of former United States Secretary of State Dean Acheson

See also
 David Rice Atchison (1807–1886), U.S. Senator from Missouri